Moladah was a biblical town of Simeon in the Negeb near Beersheba.

Biblical importance 
Moladah has several mentions in the bible: Joshua 15:26, Joshua 19:2, 1 Chronicles 4:28 and Nehemiah 11:26. In Joshua, it is just allotting land for the Tribes of Israel. In 1 Chronicles, it is in a list of places of the descendants of Simeon. In Nehemiah, it is shown as being occupied by the returning Judahite exiles. It was later turned into an Idumean fortress.

Current location 
There have been, and are, many debates concerning the current location of Moladah. Tell el-Milḥ, southeast of Beersheba, has been regularly identified with Moladah, but this mound is now thought more likely Canaanite Arad. The more likely location is Khereibet el-Waṭen, east of Beersheba, which is possibly the Arab equivalent of the Hebrew name.

See also 
 Tribes of Israel

References 

Hebrew Bible cities